Ruff Trigger: The Vanocore Conspiracy is a 2006 action-platform video game developed by Playstos Entertainment and published by Natsume in North America and by ZOO Digital Publishing in Europe and Africa for the PlayStation 2. The game was released in North America on June 28, 2006 and in Europe on August 25, 2006. It was later released as a "PS2 Classic" port for the PlayStation 3.

Gameplay 
The player takes on the role of Ruff Trigger (voiced by David Gasman), a bounty hunter sent to rescue tiny creatures known as "piglots". A shipment of them has crashed on a foreign planet, sending them all over the place. The player can use different weapons to destroy numerous mechanical enemies that face Ruff on the planet as he rescues the piglets. Other gameplay mechanics include driving sequences, explosive piglots, and a werewolf form that Ruff transforms into when he drinks a substance known as 'Vanocore Power Drink'.

Reception 

Ruff Trigger received "mixed" reviews according to the review aggregation website Metacritic.

References

External links 
 
 

2006 video games
3D platform games
Natsume (company) games
PlayStation 2 games
PlayStation Network games
Video games developed in Italy
Action video games
Single-player video games
Video games about dogs